Foucher is a surname, and may refer to:

 Alfred A. Foucher (1865–1952), French scholar 
 André Foucher (cyclist) (born 1933), French professional road bicycle racer
 Armand Foucher (1898–1976), businessman and local politician in Quebec
 Louis-Charles Foucher (1760–1829), notary and politician in Quebec
 Simon Foucher (1644–1696), French philosopher

See also
 Fouché (disambiguation)